The Shire of Mingenew is a local government area in the Mid West region of Western Australia, about  southeast of the city of Geraldton and about  north of the state capital, Perth.

History
The Shire of Mingenew was initially constituted as the Upper Irwin Road District on 25 October 1901, over a much larger area. On 12 December 1919, it was renamed the Mingenew Road District. Between 1923 and 1928, it lost 80% of its land area to the neighboring Perenjori-Morawa Road District and the new districts of Carnamah and Three Springs. By 1930, it had adopted roughly its present boundaries.

On 1 July 1961, it became a shire following the passage of the Local Government Act 1960, which reformed all remaining road districts into shires.

On 18 September 2009, the Shires of Mingenew, Three Springs, Morawa and Perenjori announced their intention to amalgamate. A formal agreement was signed five days later, and the name Billeranga was later chosen. However, by February 2011, community pressure had led to the negotiations stalling, and on 16 April 2011, voters from the Shire of Perenjori defeated the proposal at a referendum.

Wards
Since 2005 the Shire has been divided into two wards. Prior to this, a five-ward system was in place with the Town Ward having three councillors and the remaining wards one each.

 Rural Ward (three councillors)
 Town Ward (four councillors)

Towns and localities
The towns and localities of the Shire of Mingenew with population and size figures based on the most recent Australian census:

Population

Heritage-listed places

As of 2023, 62 places are heritage-listed in the Shire of Mingenew, of which three are on the State Register of Heritage Places.

References

External links

 
 Mingenew Cemetery

Mingenew
Mingenew, Western Australia